The U.S. state of Washington is home to a number of public and private ferry systems, most notably the state-run Washington State Ferries.

History

Due to Washington's geography which features large, deep bodies of water with many peninsulas and islands, ferries are a natural means of connecting communities in the region.

Washington State Ferries
Washington State Ferries, owned and operated by the Washington State Department of Transportation (WSDOT), serves communities on Puget Sound and in the San Juan Islands. 
It is the largest fleet of passenger and automobile ferries in the United States and the third largest in the world.

WSDOT Ferries

Other ferries in Washington

Publicly operated 
The Keller Ferry carries State Route 21 across Lake Roosevelt on the upper Columbia River between the Colville Indian Reservation and Clark. It is operated by WSDOT and was the first ferry operated by the state of Washington.
The Guemes Island ferry from Anacortes 5 minutes north to Guemes Island is operated by Skagit County, Washington.
Wahkiakum County operates the Wahkiakum County Ferry between Puget Island, Washington and Westport, Oregon on the lower Columbia River.
The Colville Confederated Tribes operates the M/V Columbia Princess a.k.a. the Gifford-Inchelium Ferry on the upper Columbia River.
Pierce County operates the Steilacoom-Anderson Island Ferry providing service between Steilacoom, Anderson Island and Ketron Island, using two vessels, the Christine Anderson and the Steilacoom II.  
The Washington State Department of Corrections also operates a ferry from the same dock to the McNeil Island Corrections Center.
The Lummi Island Ferry, also known as the M/V Whatcom Chief, from Gooseberry Point to Lummi Island is operated by Whatcom County.
As of November 26, 2018, Kitsap Transit operates passenger-only ferries between the following pairs: Port Orchard and Bremerton; Annapolis and Bremerton. It also operates Kitsap Fast Ferries for the following: Seattle and Bremerton; Seattle and Kingston.

Private
Many private ferries exist to serve residents of islands throughout Puget Sound and beyond into the Strait of Juan de Fuca.  For example:
High-speed catamarans, geared to tourists, run from Seattle to Victoria, British Columbia, and are operated by Victoria Clipper.
Black Ball Transport operates the M/V Coho auto/passenger ferry between Port Angeles and Victoria.
The M/V Charlie Wells crosses Case Inlet from the Key Peninsula (south of Vaughn, Washington) to Herron Island, a privately owned and operated island.
Hat Express operates Thursday to Sunday between the Everett Marina and Gedney (Hat) Island Marina.

Passenger-only 

The King County Department of Transportation operates two passenger-only ferry services known as the King County Water Taxi with service from Downtown Seattle to Vashon Island and West Seattle.
The small Jetty Island Ferry runs the short distance between the Everett Marina and the man made, unpopulated Jetty Island in the summer months for tourists.
The Lady of the Lake ferry runs year-round from Chelan to Stehekin on Lake Chelan.
Drayton Harbor Maritime operates  between Blaine and Semiahmoo Resort during summer months.

Defunct
 From 2004 to April 2007, a private company, the Kitsap Ferry Co., provided passenger-only ferry service between Bremerton and Seattle, during weekday commute times. The service was canceled due to high costs and lack of support from Kitsap Transit, whose district voters failed to pass a sales tax increase for the foot ferry.
 The most recent run between Kingston and Seattle, called Aqua Express, shut down after two years of unprofitable service. Port of Kingston's SoundRunner service operated Spirit of Kingston between Kingston and downtown Seattle, but it too has ceased operations and the Spirit of Kingston has been purchased by the King County Ferry District. West Seattle to the Seattle central business district and Bremerton to Seattle have been other passenger-only routes attempted by private enterprise.
 The M/V El Matador crossed the channel of Grays Harbor, from Ocean Shores to Westport during summer months. It was discontinued in 2008 due to the fact that the Ocean Shores Marina has not been dredged, and the vessel is unable to enter without having problems.
 Vessels geared to tourists ran from Port Angeles to Victoria, British Columbia, and were operated by Victoria Express until it ended its passenger service in 2010.
 Puget Sound Express was contracted to run MV Chilkat Express from Downtown Seattle to Des Moines as part of a two-month pilot. It began service on August 10, 2022, and is scheduled to end on October 9.

References

External links